The following is a list of notable events and releases of the year 1884 in Norwegian music.

Events

Deaths

Births

 December
 11 – Arne Svendsen, songwriter, folk poet and revue writer. (died 1958).

See also
 1884 in Norway
 Music of Norway

References

 
Norwegian music
Norwegian
Music
1880s in Norwegian music